Saliou is an African given name. Notable people with the name include: 
Saliou Akadiri (born 1950), Beninese politician and diplomat 
El Hadj Mamadou Saliou Camara, the Grand Imam of Guinea 
Saliou Ciss (born 1989), Senegalese football player
Saliou Coumbassa (1932–2003), Guinean politician and educator
Saliou Diallo (born 1976), Guinean football goalkeeper 
Mamadou Saliou Diallo (born 1995), Guinean football forward 
Saliou Lassissi (born 1978), Ivorian football defender
Serigne Saliou Mbacké (1915–2007), Grand Marabout (leader) of the Mouride movement in Senegal 
Saliou Sané (born 1992), German-Senegalese football forward 
Saliou Seck (born 1955), Senegalese sprinter at the 1984 Olympics